Sitochroa is a genus of moths of the family Crambidae.

Species
Sitochroa aureolalis (Hulst, 1886)
Sitochroa chortalis (Grote, 1873)
Sitochroa concoloralis (Lederer, 1857)
Sitochroa dasconalis (Walker, 1859)
Sitochroa palealis (Denis & Schiffermüller, 1775)
Sitochroa straminealis (Hampson, 1900)
Sitochroa subtilis Filipjev, 1927
Sitochroa umbrosalis (Warren, 1892)
Sitochroa verticalis (Linnaeus, 1758)

References

Natural History Museum Lepidoptera genus database

Pyraustinae
Crambidae genera
Taxa named by Jacob Hübner